Night Light is a South Korean television series starring Lee Yo-won, Jin Goo, and Uee. It aired on MBC every Monday and Tuesday at 22:00 (KST) starting from November 21, 2016.

Plot 
A story of three individuals propelled by their undying greed as they clamor for wealth and power in order to reign supreme at the top of the food chain. Seo Yi-kyung (Lee Yo-won), a cold crystal of a woman who is willing to do anything for her ambitions and she doesn't believe that greed is a sin. Park Gun-woo (Jin Goo), a warm-hearted, free-spirited man of integrity and the heir of a big company who got betrayed by his love, Yi-kyung, 12 years ago. Lee Se-jin (Uee) is a hired persona and comes from a poor family, she lost her parents when she was young, and desperately wants to escape from her situation.

Cast

Main 
 Lee Yo-won as Seo Yi-kyung
A cold woman and the embodiment of heated passion who wants to be the queen of her own enterprise.
 Jin Goo as Park Gun-woo
A chaebol's son with a free-spirited personality, and initially decides to put aside his status to pursue music.
 Uee as Lee Se-jin
A poor woman who works multiple jobs to turn her life around.

Supporting

S Finance 
 Choi Il-hwa as Seo Bong-soo
 Choi Min as Jo Seong-mook
 Shim Yi-young as Writer Kim
 Jung Hae-in as Tak

Sejin's family 
 Yoon Bok-in as Kim Hwa-sook
 Kim Go-eun as Shin Song-mi
 Kim Bo-yoon as Shin Dong-mi

Mujin Group 
 Jung Han-yong as Park Moo-il
 Lee Jae-yong as Park Moo-sam
 Nam Gi-ae as Moon Hee-jeong

Tianjin Finance 
 Jun Gook-hwan as Son Ee-sung
 Park Seon-woo as Son Gi-tae
 Lee Ho-jung as Son Ma-ri

BaekSong Foundation 
 Jung Dong-hwan as Jang Tae-joon
 Song Yeong-kyu as Nam Jong-kyu

Others 

 Lee Yoon-sang
 Cha Sun-hyung
 Hwang Shi-myung
 Kim Sa-hoon
 Sung Nak-kyung
 Min Joon-hyun
 Seo Yoon-seok
 Kim Hyun
 Na Jong-soo
 Kwon Hyeok-soo
 Jun Jin-gi
 Son Sun-keun
 Kim Yong-hwan
 Bae Gi-beom

Special appearance 
 Kim Kang-hyun
 Jung Seung-gil
 Oh Jung-se

Production 
The first script reading took place September 27, 2016 at MBC Broadcasting Station in Sangam, South Korea and filming began on October 4 in Seoul. The cast started filming in Fukuoka, Japan on October 16. The filming then moved to Nagoya on October 30.

Payment controversy
Three months after the end of Night Light, the TV Chosun subsidiary HIGROUND (then known as C-Story), one of its producers, was accused of not duly compensating the actors of the drama. When sought for comment, the company's management said that it was "confused by the reports and that while payments have been delayed, they have been communicating with all of the as-yet-unpaid actors".

Original Soundtrack

OST Part 1

OST Part 2

OST Part 3

Charted Songs

Ratings 
 In the table below, the blue numbers represent the lowest ratings and the red numbers represent the highest ratings.
 NR denotes that the drama did not rank in the top 20 daily programs on that date

International broadcast
Netflix acquired the international rights for the drama and is using the name White Nights for it.

Notes

References 

2016 in South Korean television
2016 South Korean television series debuts
MBC TV television dramas
South Korean melodrama television series
Television series by Victory Contents
Korean-language Netflix exclusive international distribution programming